G-protein coupled receptor 97 also known as adhesion G protein-coupled receptor G3 (ADGRG3) is a protein that in humans is encoded by the ADGRG3 gene. GPR97 is a member of the adhesion GPCR family.
Adhesion GPCRs are characterized by an extended extracellular region often possessing N-terminal protein modules that is linked to a TM7 region via a domain known as the GPCR-Autoproteolysis INducing (GAIN) domain.

GPR97 is expressed in human granulocytes and endothelial cells of the vasculature as well as in mouse granulocytes, monocytes, macrophages, and dendritic cells.

Signaling 
The inositol phosphate (IP3) accumulation, aequorin, and 35S isotope binding assays in overexpressing HEK293 cells have demonstrated coupling of GPR97 to Gαo protein triggering cyclic adenosine monophosphate (cAMP). GPR97 actives cAMP response element-binding protein (CREB), NF-κB, and small GTPases to regulate cellular functions.

Function 
Systemic steroid exposure is a therapy to treat a variety of medical conditions and is associated with epigenetic processes such as DNA methylation that may reflect pharmacological responses and/or side effects. GPR97 was found to be differently methylated at CpG sites in the genome of blood cells from patient under systemic steroid treatment. GPR97 is transcribed in immune cells. Gene-deficient mice revealed that Gpr97 is crucial for maintaining B-cell population via constitutive CREB and NF-κB activities. Human lymphatic endothelial cells (LECs) abundantly express GPR97. Silencing GPR97 in human LECs indicated that GPR97 modulates cytoskeletal rearrangement, cell adhesion and migration through regulating the small GTPase RhoA and cdc42. In vertebrates, GPR97 has an indispensable role in the bone morphogenetic proteins (BMP) signaling pathway in bone formation. A microarray meta-analysis revealed that mouse Gpr97 is a direct transcriptional target of BMP signaling in long bone development.

References

External links 
 Adhesion GPCR consortium

G protein-coupled receptors